Barthol Chapel is a small village in the Formartine area of Aberdeenshire, Scotland, named after the Catholic saint, St Bartholomew. Barthol Chapel has a school with a very small football pitch, and a church. The local language is Doric language of North East Scotland. The nearest villages are Methlick, Fyvie, Oldmeldrum and Tarves.

References

Villages in Aberdeenshire